Gustav Ingvar Rydell  (7 May 1922 – 20 June 2013) was a Swedish football forward who played for Malmö FF. He also represented Sweden in the 1950 FIFA World Cup in Brazil. and won a bronze medal at the 1952 Summer Olympics in Finland.

References

External links
 
 

1922 births
2013 deaths
Swedish footballers
Sweden international footballers
Association football forwards
Allsvenskan players
Malmö FF players
1950 FIFA World Cup players
Footballers at the 1952 Summer Olympics
Olympic footballers of Sweden
Olympic bronze medalists for Sweden
Olympic medalists in football

Medalists at the 1952 Summer Olympics